Sphenomorphus woodfordi  is a species of skink, a lizard in the family Scincidae. The species is native to the Solomon Islands and Bougainville.

Etymology
The specific name, woodfordi, is in honor of British naturalist Charles Morris Woodford.

Habitat

Description
Dorsally, S. woodfordi is glossy metallic dark brown, with curved or oblique black crossbars on the flanks. Ventrally it is yellowish.

Reproduction
The mode of reproduction of S. woodfordi is unknown.

References

Further reading
Adler GH, Austin CC, Dudley R (1995). "Dispersal and speciation of skinks among archipelagos in the tropical Pacific Ocean". Evolutionary Ecology 9: 529–541. (Sphenomorphus woodfordi, new combination).
Boulenger GA (1887). Catalogue of the Lizards in the British Museum (Natural History). Second Edition. Volume III. ... Scincidæ ... . London: Trustees of the British Museum (Natural History). (Taylor and Francis, printers). xii + 575 pp. + Plates I–XL. (Lygosoma woodfordii, new species, p. 511 + Plate XXV, figure 4).

woodfordi
Taxa named by George Albert Boulenger
Reptiles described in 1887
Reptiles of the Solomon Islands